Weidenmann is a German and Swiss surname. Notable people with the surname include:

Alfred Weidenmann (1916–2000), German film director and screenwriter
Bernd Weidenmann (b. 1945), German psychology professor and author
Jacob Weidenmann (1829–1893), Swiss-American landscape architect
Johann Caspar Weidenmann (1805–1850), Swiss painter

German-language surnames